Strawberry Crater is a cinder cone volcano, more than  high, in the San Francisco volcanic field,  north of Flagstaff, Arizona. It is along Forest Road 545 between the Wupatki National Monument and Sunset Crater National Monument in the Strawberry Crater Wilderness. The northwestern end of the crater is covered with lava flows, while the southern end is filled with low cinder cones. Several of the surrounding cones include the better known, taller and younger Sunset Crater in the adjacent Sunset Crater National Monument.

The surface landforms are about 50,000 to 100,000 years old.

Name 
The cone shape and the reddish cinders that created the cone resemble a giant strawberry.

Geology 
Experts say that Strawberry Crater is relatively young compared to other craters in the United States. There were several volcanic periods, during which multi-colored rocks were deposited on Earth's surface. Nine-hundred-year-old Sinagua ruins in the vicinity include evidence of gardens that used volcanic cinders as a water-retaining mulch. There are many different paths leading to the crater, but there is only one trail that is marked. Surrounding the crater, there are rolling cinder-strewn hills with a variety of different plants from pinons to junipers.

From the top of the cinder cones there are views of the Kachina Peaks Wilderness, the Hopi Buttes, the Painted Desert, and the valley of the Little Colorado River. The geologic forms and twisted junipers make Strawberry Crater Wilderness a popular place for photography.

Climate 
Hiking and recreation at Strawberry Crater is open year-round. Winters near the crater average to around 50 degrees, while summers tend to be very hot and dry. There are very few natural water sources near the hiking trail, so travelers are advised to bring a sufficient amount of water.

Archaeology 
Around the actual crater, there are low walls of stacked rock. These walls are said to be Native American constructions. There are also remnants of ancient gardens where inhabitants used volcanic cinders for water-retaining mulch.

Recreation 
Strawberry Crater offers a variety of recreational activities such as day hiking and horseback riding. Information about these activities can be found on the Coconino National Forest recreational website.

See also
 List of Arizona Wilderness Areas
 List of U.S. Wilderness Areas
 Wilderness Act

References

External links 
 Strawberry Crater Wilderness – Coconino National Forest
 Sunset Crater National Monument – National Park Service
 Wupatki National Monument – National Park Service

Landforms of Coconino County, Arizona
Wilderness areas of Arizona
Protected areas of Coconino County, Arizona
Volcanoes of Arizona
Cinder cones of the United States
Mountains of Arizona
Mountains of Coconino County, Arizona